The College of Aeronautical Engineering (CAE) is an institution for education of Aeronautical Engineering in Pakistan  located at the National University of Sciences and Technology, Risalpur (Campus), Khyber Pakhtunkhwa, Pakistan. It is a constituent college of National University of Sciences and Technology, Pakistan (NUST).

History
The college was set up  in 1965 at  Korangi Creek, Karachi. In 1986, the college moved to its current location at Risalpur. It was previously attached with Karachi University and has been a part of NUST since 1994.

Academics
The college offers undergraduate programs in Aerospace and Avionics Engineering. It got ISO-9001 certification in 1999. The college has five academic departments – Aerospace Engineering, Avionics Engineering, Industrial Engineering, Humanities and Science and Professional Continuing Education.

References

External links
College of Aeronautical Engineering (CAE,NUST)/
National University of Sciences and Technology (NUST)

National University of Sciences & Technology
Engineering universities and colleges in Pakistan
Universities and colleges in Nowshera District
Educational institutions established in 1965
1965 establishments in Pakistan